Elliniko is the current southern terminus on Athens Metro Line 2 since the Elliniko extension opened on 26 July 2013. With the opening of the station, travel time from Elliniko to Syntagma Square was reduced from 45 minutes (by car) to 20 minutes.

Location

The station is adjacent to Vouliagmenis Avenue, at its section north of the closed Ellinikon International Airport. It has two exits to the ground level, one on each side of Vouliagmenis Avenue, with the southern exit to have a metallic oval shaped roof, as well as a square.

Construction

Construction works of the station started in 2007. While initially being planned to be delivered by 2009, and later 2010, it was finally inaugurated in July 2013, after three and a half years of delays, because of the Siemens Greek bribery scandal.

Bus connections

Several bus lines of Athens Mass Transit System operate from the station, so as to provide connections with Athens International Airport and several southern suburbs of Athens.

 171 & 122Θ  Argyroupoli metro station - Varkiza (122Θ οperates between June and July)
 122 Argyroupoli metro station - Saronida
 A3 Academy - Glyfada via Vouliagmenis Avenue
 X97 Elliniko metro station - Athens International Airport
 790 Glyfada - Peristeri (operating from 00:30 to 04:30)
 124 Glyfada - Agia Triada - Argyroupoli metro station
 154 Panorama Voulas - Ano Glyfada - Argyroupoli metro station
 205 Glyfada - Sourmena - Terpsithea

Gallery

References

Athens Metro stations
Elliniko-Argyroupoli
Railway stations opened in 2013
2013 establishments in Greece